Albert Henry Thomas (1 July 1888 – 13 January 1963) was a British bantamweight professional boxer who won a gold medal in Boxing at the 1908 Summer Olympics. He fought as Harry Thomas.

Boxing career
Thomas won the 1908 Amateur Boxing Association British bantamweight title, when boxing out of the Birmingham ABC. He then competed for Great Britain at the 1908 Olympic Games in the boxing bantamweight division, where he won the gold medal with a decision over John Condon in the final.

In 1909 he went to the United States, where he remained except for a trip to Australia in 1913 and a visit to England in 1947. He served in the United States Navy in World War I and became an American citizen. He was born in Birmingham, England and died in New York City, United States.

1908 Olympic boxing record
Thomas competed as a bantamweight boxer for Great Britain at the 1908 London Olympics.  The bantamweight division featured six boxers.  Five were British; one was French.  Here are Thomas' results from that boxing tournament:

 Quarterfinal: defeated Frank McGurk (Great Britain) by decision
 Semifinal: bye
 Final: defeated John Condon (Great Britain) by decision (won gold medal)

References

External links

Olympics database profile

1888 births
Boxers from Birmingham, West Midlands
English male boxers
English Olympic medallists
Olympic boxers of Great Britain
Bantamweight boxers
Olympic gold medallists for Great Britain
Boxers at the 1908 Summer Olympics
Olympic medalists in boxing
1963 deaths
Medalists at the 1908 Summer Olympics
United States Navy personnel of World War I